The oceanic whitetip shark (Carcharhinus longimanus) is a large pelagic requiem shark inhabiting tropical and warm temperate seas. It has a stocky body with long, white-tipped, rounded fins. The species is typically solitary, though they may gather in large numbers at food concentrations. Bony fish and cephalopods are the main components of its diet and females give live birth.

Though slow-moving, it is opportunistic and aggressive, and is reputed to be dangerous to shipwreck survivors. The IUCN Red List considers the species to be critically endangered. Recent studies show steeply declining populations as they are harvested for their fins and meat. As with other shark species, the whitetip faces mounting fishing pressure throughout its range.

Taxonomy
The oceanic whitetip shark, or lesser white shark, was described in 1831 by naturalist René-Primevère Lesson, who named the shark Carcharhinus maou. It was next described by Cuban Felipe Poey in 1861 as Squalus longimanus. The name Pterolamiops longimanus has also been used. The species epithet  refers to the size of its pectoral fins ( means "long fingers" in Latin). The oceanic whitetip shark is called many things in English: Brown Milbert's sand bar shark, brown shark, nigano shark, oceanic white-tipped whaler, and whitetip shark.

The rules of the International Commission on Zoological Nomenclature are that in general the first-published description has priority; therefore, the valid scientific name for the oceanic whitetip shark should be Carcharhinus maou. However, Lesson's name remained forgotten for so long that Carcharhinus longimanus remains widely accepted.

Distribution and habitat
It is found worldwide between 45°N and 43°S latitude. It was once extremely common and widely distributed, and still inhabits a wide band around the globe; however, recent studies suggest that its numbers have drastically declined. 

The shark spends most of its time in the upper layer of the ocean—to a depth of —and prefers off-shore, deep-ocean areas. According to longline capture data, increasing distance from land correlates to a greater population of sharks.

Description
C. longimanus most distinguishing characteristics are its long, wing-like pectoral and dorsal fins. The fins are significantly larger than most other shark species, and are conspicuously rounded. The shark's snout is rounded and its eyes are circular, with nictitating membranes.

The oceanic whitetip shark is a robust, large-bodied shark. In the 1990s, the sharks of the species from the same area averaged only . 

The species is grey-bronze dorsally and white ventrally. As its name suggests, most of its fins (dorsal, pectoral, pelvic and caudal) have white tips. Along with white tips, the fins may be mottled, and young specimens can have black marks. A saddle-like patch may be apparent between first and second dorsal fins. The shark has two kinds of teeth. Those in the mandible (lower jaw) have are thinner with a serrated tip. Between 13 and 15 teeth are on either side of the jaw. The teeth in the upper jaw are triangular, but much larger and wider with entirely serrated edges—14 or 15 occur along each side. The denticles are nearly flat and wide, typically have between five and seven ridges. There is little overlap between them, revealing some skin.

Behaviour
 
The oceanic whitetip is typically solitary, though gatherings have been observed where food is plentiful. It swims during the day and night. The oceanic whitetip is usually solitary and slow-moving and tends to cruise near the top of the water column in open water. During summer, when the water surface is warmer, oceanic whitetips tend to swim more quickly and at deeper depths. They have been observed to breach out of the water. 

The species feeds mainly on pelagic cephalopods, like squid, and bony fish, such as lancetfish, oarfish, barracuda, jacks, mahi-mahi, marlin, tuna, and mackerel. However, its diet can be far more varied and less selective—it is known to eat threadfins, stingrays, sea turtles, birds, gastropods, crustaceans, and dead mammals. Its feeding methods include  swimming through schools of frenzied tuna with an open mouth and waiting for the fish to swim in before biting down. When whaling took place in warm waters, oceanic whitetips were the most common scavengers of floating carcasses. Whitetips commonly compete for food with silky sharks, making up for its comparatively leisurely swimming style with aggressive displays. They are known to trail pilot whales since they both feed on squid.

Pilot fish, dolphinfish, and remora may follow these sharks. Evidence in the form of sucker scars on the skin of an individual filmed off Hawaii indicate that the species may also dive deep enough to battle with giant squid. Until the 16th century, sharks were known to mariners as "sea dogs" and the oceanic whitetip, the most common ship-following shark. Groups often form when individuals converge on a food source. They are recorded to segregate by both sex and size. They commonly get into feeding frenzies. Oceanic whitetips gather in large numbers off Cat Island, Bahamas from winter to spring, due to the abundance of large bony fish.

Lifecycle
Mating and birthing seems to occur in early summer in the northwest Atlantic Ocean and southwest Indian Ocean, although females captured in the Pacific have been found with embryos year round, suggesting a longer mating season there. The shark is viviparous—embryos develop in utero and are fed by a placental sac. Its gestation period lasts nine months to one year.

In the Pacific, sharks appear to mature at four to five years. One oceanic whitetip shark was estimated to have lived 22 years.

Interactions with humans

Oceanographic researcher Jacques Cousteau described the oceanic whitetip as "the most dangerous of all sharks". Author and big-game fisherman Ernest Hemingway depicted them as aggressive opportunists that attacked the catch of fishermen. After the USS Indianapolis was torpedoed on 30 July 1945, some sailors who survived the sinking reportedly died from exposure to the elements and some may have died from shark bites. According to survivor accounts published in several books about sharks and shark attacks, potentially hundreds of the Indianapolis crew were eventually killed by sharks before a plane spotted them on the 5th day after the sinking. Oceanic whitetips are believed to have been responsible for most if not all of those attacks. Also during World War II, the RMS Nova Scotia, a steamship carrying about 1,000 people near South Africa, was sunk by a German submarine. One hundred and ninety-two people survived; many deaths were attributed to the whitetip. Subsequently, the species is recorded to have attacked 21 people between 1955 and 2020, including nine divers, eight swimmers, two fisherman, one shipwrecked person and one fallen pilot. Five of these attacks were fatal.

In Egypt in 2010, one oceanic whitetip was implicated in several bites on tourists in the Red Sea near Sharm El Sheikh, resulting in one death and four injuries to humans. Accumulating evidence revealed this shark to have been conditioned to being hand fed. In October 2019, an oceanic whitetip shark brutally attacked a female snorkeler off Mo'orea, French Polynesia, but the person survived. Based on eyewitness reports and examinations of the bites, the shark appears to have been acting like a predator attacking prey.

The oceanic whitetip has been kept in captivity. Among five recorded captive oceanic whitetips, the three with time records all lived for more than a year in captivity. One of these, a female in Monterey Bay Aquarium's Outer-Bay exhibit, lived for more than three years before dying in 2003, during which it grew . The two remaining lack a time record, but grew about  during their time in captivity.

Conservation status

As of 2019, the IUCN Red List list the oceanic whitetip shark as critically endangered, as their numbers appear to have decreased in every ocean region they inhabit. While their total global population is unknown, they are estimated to have declined by around 98 percent "with the highest probability of >80% reduction over three generation lengths (61.2 years).". 

In 1969, Lineaweaver and Backus wrote of the oceanic whitetip: "[it is] extraordinarily abundant, perhaps the most abundant large animal, large being over 100 pounds [45 kg], on the face of the earth". A study focusing on the northwest Atlantic and Gulf of Mexico, using a mix of data from US pelagic longline surveys from the mid-1950s and observations from the late 1990s, estimated a decline in numbers in this location of 99.3% over this period. However, changes in fishing practices and data collection methods complicate estimates. According to a January 2021 study in Nature which studied 31 species of sharks and rays, the number of these species found in open oceans had dropped by 71 per cent in around 50 years. The oceanic whitetip was included in the study. 

Oceanic whitetip sharks are mainly threatened by fisheries, sometimes intentional but usually bycatch. They are victims of longlines, hook-lines, gillnets and trawls. The sharks are used for their fins and meat. It is eaten fresh, smoked, dried, and salted and its skin made into leather. Bycatching of oceanic whitetip sharks may be reduced by removing hooks from longliners when they are in shallow water. Sharks may also be threatened by pollution. Those in the northwest Atlantic have been found to accumulate high amounts of mercury.

In March 2013, the oceanic whitetip was added to Appendix II of CITES meaning the species (including parts and derivatives) require CITES permits for international trade. On 30 January 2018, NOAA Fisheries published a final rule to list the oceanic whitetip shark as a threatened species under the United States Endangered Species Act (ESA) (83 FR 4153). From 3 January 2013, the shark was fully protected in New Zealand territorial waters under the Wildlife Act 1953. The New Zealand Department of Conservation has classified the oceanic whitetip shark as "Migrant" with the qualifier "Secure Overseas" under the New Zealand Threat Classification System.

See also

 Blacktip reef shark
 List of sharks
 List of threatened sharks
 Outline of sharks
 Shark attack

References

External links

 
 
 

oceanic whitetip shark
Pantropical fish
Viviparous fish
Critically endangered fish
Species endangered by use as food
oceanic whitetip shark
oceanic whitetip shark